The women's all-events competition at the 2010 Asian Games in Guangzhou was held from 16 November to 22 November 2010 at Tianhe Bowling Hall.

All-events scores are compiled by totaling series scores from the singles, doubles, trios and team competitions.

Schedule
All times are China Standard Time (UTC+08:00)

Results 
Legend
DNS — Did not start

 Zhang Yuhong was awarded bronze because of no three-medal sweep per country rule.

References 

Results at ABF Website
Bowling Digital

External links
Bowling Site of 2010 Asian Games

Women's all-events